The Tesla Files is a dramatized documentary series, broadcast in 2018 on the History Channel, based on mysteries surrounding the legacy of inventor Nikola Tesla.

Overview
A team investigates mysteries involving the work of Nikola Tesla. Shortly before his death in 1943, Tesla claimed to have had 80 trunks containing details of his work, but much fewer were ever found: in the first episode, the team investigates whether there was a cover-up to suppress his work. The team also performs experiments in an attempt to validate some of Tesla's claims.

Episodes
The show lasted one season consisting of five episodes on The History Channel.

Season 1

References

External links
 
 
 Tesla Files on TVGuide

2018 American television series debuts
2018 American television series endings
2010s American reality television series
English-language television shows
History (American TV channel) original programming
Works about Nikola Tesla